Ludvig Oliver Svanberg (born 15 December 2002) is a Swedish footballer who plays as a centre-back for Hammarby IF in Allsvenskan.

Early life
Born and raised in Stockholm, Svanberg started to play youth football with local club Hammarby IF.

Club career

Hammarby IF
On 20 November 2019, Svanberg signed his first professional contract with Hammarby. In 2020, he made his debut in senior football on loan at IK Frej in Ettan, Sweden's third tier, making 25 league appearances at age 17. In both 2021 and 2022, Svanberg played for Hammarby's affiliated club Hammarby TFF, also competing in Ettan, making 44 appearances in total.

On 10 August 2022, he signed a new two and a half year-contract with Hammarby, running until the end of 2024. On 25 February 2023, Svanberg made his competitive debut for the club, starting in a 3–0 away win against Norrby IF in Svenska Cupen.

International career
In September 2019, Svanberg was called up to the Swedish under-19's for three friendlies against Norway, Ireland and Austria, but he remained an unused substitute without making any appearances.

Career statistics

Club

Notes

References

External links
 
 

2002 births
Living people
Footballers from Stockholm
Swedish footballers
Association football defenders
Ettan Fotboll players
Hammarby Fotboll players
Hammarby Talang FF players
IK Frej players